The 2012 Grote Prijs Jef Scherens was the 46th edition of the Grote Prijs Jef Scherens cycle race and was held on 2 September 2012. The race started and finished in Leuven. The race was won by Steven Caethoven.

General classification

References

2012
2012 in road cycling
2012 in Belgian sport